Pierre Brizard (1737–1804) was a French furniture designer.

References

1737 births
1804 deaths
Furniture designers from Paris